Eric John Paton (born 1 August 1978 in Glasgow) is a retired Scottish professional footballer.

Paton developed into a right back, a position that ex-Queens manager John Connolly favoured the former right sided midfielder in. However his versatility seen him deployed on the right-back of a midfield five, just inside the wide left man and at left back.

Paton joined Dundee in June 2008, after he signed a pre-contract agreement with the club on 24 January 2008. On 15 October 2010, Paton had his contract terminated by Dundee, a victim of the club entering administration.

Career statistics 

A.  The "Other" column constitutes appearances (including substitutes) and goals in the Scottish Challenge Cup.

Honours
Dundee
Scottish Challenge Cup: 2009–10

References

External links 
 

1978 births
Footballers from Glasgow
Living people
Association football fullbacks
Scottish footballers
Hibernian F.C. players
Partick Thistle F.C. players
Stenhousemuir F.C. players
Clydebank F.C. (1965) players
Queen of the South F.C. players
Dundee F.C. players
Scottish Football League players